James Michael Johnston (born July 7, 1989) is a Canadian actor and singer-songwriter. He is best known for his role as Peter Stone on Degrassi: The Next Generation.

Personal life and career
Johnston was born July 7, 1989 in Toronto, Ontario, Canada. Johnston portrayed Peter Stone on Degrassi: The Next Generation from 2005 to 2010. He has been nominated for 8 Young Artist Awards in Los Angeles and won 2.  He has also starred in the series Wild Card and Zixx: Level One. He has a wide range of interests, including soccer, snowboarding, skateboarding, cycling and playing the guitar and numerous other instruments.  Jamie went to Kenya with the organization "Free the Children" to build a school and filmed as a special for MTV. Jamie has made numerous appearances on ET Canada and etalk. He has traveled extensively.  He played guitar in a band called SoundSpeed along with a few of his fellow Degrassi cast mates. He also played the male lead as Lucas Green in the feature film Love Me.  Other films include, "Jesus Henry Christ",  "The Tenth Circle", "Killer Instinct",  "My Babysitter's a Vampire", and numerous Movie of Week productions. In 2016, Johnston reprised his role as Peter Stone on Degrassi: Next Class for 4 episodes during its second season.  He is currently in another band that has been signed, as the drummer.  He also writes and composes.

Filmography

Symphony of Fire – Independent Short

Theatre
Aesop Fables: A Man, A Boy & A Donkey – Donkey
The Chrysalids – Mark
Epimenides – Cabin Boy
Job & The Snake – Neptune

References

External links

 
Jamie Johnston talks to the TVaddict.com

1989 births
Living people
21st-century Canadian male actors
Canadian male child actors
Canadian male film actors
Canadian male television actors
Male actors from Toronto